Luis Fernando Pérez (Madrid, Spain; 1977) is a Spanish classical pianist.

He first studied piano at Pozuelo de Alarcón conservatoire where he received top grades. In 1993 he entered the Reina Sofía School of Music where he studied with renowned Dmitri Bashkirov, Galina Eguiazarova and chamber music with Márta Gulyás. Then he moved to the Cologne University of Music to continue his training with Pierre-Laurent Aimard.

He has recorded several albums and performed in myriad stages around the US, Japan and Europe.

He has received several awards including the Franz Liszt Prize at the IBLA International Competition, the Alicia de Larrocha Award and the Albéniz Medal for his recording of Albéniz’s Iberia

External links 

 Official website
 Biography

1977 births
Living people
Spanish classical pianists
Male classical pianists
21st-century classical pianists
21st-century male musicians
Spanish male musicians